Landrienne is a township municipality in the Canadian province of Quebec, located in the Abitibi Regional County Municipality. It is part of the census agglomeration of Amos.

Originally known as Saint-Barnabé-de-Landrienne, the place was named in honour of Jean-Marie Landriève Des Bordes (1712–1778), a French naval officer and administrative inspector.

Demographics 

Private dwellings occupied by usual residents are 398, out of 410 total dwellings. The mother tongues are:
 English as first language: 0%
 French as first language: 100%
 English and French as first language: 0%
 Other as first language: 0%

Population trend:
 Population in 2021: 897 (2016 to 2011 population change: -7.2%)
 Population in 2016: 967 
 Population in 2011: 977 
 Population in 2006: 986
 Population in 2001: 1072
 Population in 1996: 1007
 Population in 1991: 1044

Municipal council
 Mayor: François Lemieux
 Councillors: Julie Auger, Maryse Bélanger, Réal Champagne, Steve Champagne, Richard Lecompte, Carole Perron

References

Township municipalities in Quebec
Incorporated places in Abitibi-Témiscamingue